Dmitry Nikolayevich Abakumov (born 8 July 1989) is a Russian professional association football player for Ararat-Armenia.

Career
Abakumov made his professional debut on 30 April 2009 in a Russian First Division game for FC KAMAZ Naberezhnye Chelny against FC Vityaz Podolsk.

On 28 June 2012, Abakumov signed a two-year contract with Russian Premier League club Mordovia Saransk.

In 2014, Abakumov played for FNL side Gazovik Orenburg.

On 13 December 2017, Abakumov left FC Orenburg by mutual consent.

In June 2018, Abakumov joined Armenian Premier League club Ararat-Armenia.

Career statistics

Club

Honours

Club
Ararat-Armenia
 Armenian Premier League (2): 2018–19, 2019–20
 Armenian Supercup (1): 2019

References

External links

1989 births
Footballers from Voronezh
Living people
Russian footballers
Association football goalkeepers
Russia youth international footballers
FC KAMAZ Naberezhnye Chelny players
FC Mordovia Saransk players
FC Orenburg players
PFC CSKA Moscow players
FC Luch Vladivostok players
FC Fakel Voronezh players
FC Ararat-Armenia players
Russian Premier League players
Russian First League players
Armenian Premier League players
Russian expatriate footballers
Expatriate footballers in Armenia